Secret Strings is a lost 1918 American silent crime drama film produced and distributed by Metro Pictures. Olive Tell, a stage actress, starred in the story based on a play by Kate Jordan. John Ince directed.

Plot
As described in a film magazine, Janet Howell (Tell) discovers that her husband Raoul (Kelly) is a crook. She leaves him and attempts to make a living painting pictures. She takes a position as a companion to Mrs. de Giles (Wainwright) in the hope of recovering some valuable mining property which her husband assures her belongs to a friend of his. Her husband visits the house using the name Newell and tells her to find where the safe is located. Newell drugs the coffee so that the de Giles and Hugh Maxwell (Thompson), a relative, fall into a stupor, and he tells Janet to change her clothes and be ready to leave with him. However, the de Giles are cleverer detectives and have been waiting for this chance to catch their man, and Newell is arrested. He makes a last frantic attempt to escape but is shot by the Detective (Lawrence) and falls down the stairs and breaks his neck. Janet's innocence is believed and Hugh confesses his love for her.

Cast
Olive Tell as Janet Howell
William J. Kelly as Raoul Howell / Newell
Hugh Thompson as Hugh Maxwell
John Daly Murphy as Richard de Giles
Marie Wainwright as Mrs. de Giles
Hugh Jeffrey as Ross
Barbara Winthrop as Katia
Bert Tuey as Williams
John Smiley as Benjamin Moraud
Edward Lawrence as Detective

Reception
Like many American films of the time, Secret Strings was subject to cuts by city and state film censorship boards. For example, the Chicago Board of Censors required a cut, in Reel 5, gagging and binding the young woman, two scenes of thieves at panel, and emptying jewels from tray into bag.

References

External links

Lantern slide promoting the film Secret Strings(Wayback Machine)

1918 films
Lost American films
American crime drama films
American silent feature films
American films based on plays
1918 crime drama films
1918 lost films
American black-and-white films
Lost crime drama films
1910s American films
Silent American drama films